Theo van Woerkom (born 26 July 1993) is a New Zealand cricketer who plays for Canterbury. He made his first-class debut on 15 October 2015 in the 2015–16 Plunket Shield. In June 2018, he was awarded a contract with Canterbury for the 2018–19 season. He made his List A debut for Canterbury in the 2018–19 Ford Trophy on 24 October 2018 against Wellington.

In June 2020, he was offered a contract by Canterbury ahead of the 2020–21 domestic cricket season.

References

External links
 

1993 births
Living people
New Zealand cricketers
Canterbury cricketers
Cricketers from Christchurch